Tax Fairness Oregon is the largest Reagan-era tax advocacy organization in the U.S. state of Oregon. Its mission is to "reform our tax code so that it serves the common good, not special interests." It tries to shape tax policy by monitoring and evaluating tax concepts, identifying and analyzing critical bills, testifying at legislative hearings and meeting with legislators, raising awareness of tax issues through media outreach, and building coalitions with partner organizations.

History

Tax Fairness Oregon was started by Jody Wiser,

Activism

Estate Tax
In Oregon inheritance tax, is also referred to as an estate tax or "Death Tax". The tax begins at properties valued at $1 Million, the rate fluctuates from 10%-16%, depending on the value of the property. Proponents of ending the tax claim it is an unfair double tax on property that has been handed down from generation to generation, citing instances where families had to break up long distinguished businesses to pay the tax. Marie Bowers, president of Oregon Women for Agriculture and chief petitioner stated "ending Oregon's death tax is about ... sustaining the legacy and land my great-great grandpa started farming over a century ago that is my family's livelihood." The Tax Fairness of Oregon has criticized this legislature. The chair of TFO Jody Wiser, countered claims that it is a double tax by explaining capital gains on the property are not taxed until the asset has been transferred. In a statement to the Capital Press, Wiser said "When people say it has already been taxed and it is being taxed twice, that is mostly a dishonest claim."

Business Energy Tax Credit Program
The group has also brought awareness to the Business Energy Tax Credit Program, which guarantees 15% of lottery dollars to fund conservation organizations. Measure 76 allows for an increased budget if funds from the lottery increase, but if they decrease they cannot receive less than 15% of the profits regardless of other programs that would receive less funding. The measure also directs all grants to nonprofits, excluding state and federal agencies from using these dollars. This includes public schools. Elsa Porter stated in the Willamette Week that:
<blockquote> "Most importantly, the ballot measure limits the legislature's ability to make critical choices about how to use the state's resources in a crisis. It gives the legislature no choice -- for the rest of time we'll continue adding to state lands, buying new picnic tables and restoring streambeds, but our children will use 15, 20, 30 year old science texts, or be without music, arts, and physical education teachers."

References

External links 
 

Non-profit organizations based in Oregon
Tax reform in the United States